"Everything Is Everything" is a song recorded by American recording artist Lauryn Hill for her debut solo studio album The Miseducation of Lauryn Hill (1998). It was written by Hill and Johari Newton, and produced by Hill. During the recording sessions, Hill wanted to write about injustice and struggles amongst youth communities in inner city areas of the United States. The song contains R&B, 1960s soul, and hip hop influences. It marked the first commercial appearance of singer and pianist John Legend, who was 19 years old when he played the piano on the song. The song was released as the third and final single from The Miseducation of Lauryn Hill on May 3, 1999, by Ruffhouse Records and Columbia Records.

"Everything Is Everything" garnered acclaim from critics, many of whom praised its lyrical themes and genre variance. The song was a top 40 hit in the United States, peaking at number 35 on the Billboard Hot 100 and has been certified gold by the Recording Industry Association of America (RIAA). Internationally, it reached the top 20 in New Zealand and the United Kingdom. The song was nominated for a Soul Train Lady of Soul Award; it also received a Grammy Award nomination for Best Female R&B Vocal Performance, however it was revoked due to being released in the previous eligibility period.

The accompanying music video for "Everything Is Everything" was directed by Sanji, and filmed in the Method Studios in Los Angeles. It depicted Hill walking throughout New York City. The video received three MTV Video Music Award nominations, including Best Hip Hop Video. At the 42nd Annual Grammy Awards (2000), it was nominated for Best Short Form Music Video. In 2010, Pitchfork listed it as one of the "Top 50 Music Videos of the 1990s". The song was covered by The Roots and Booker T. Jones for the latter's album The Road from Memphis (2011).

Critical reception
"Everything Is Everything" received widespread critical acclaim, both upon its release and retrospectively. In 2008, About.com ranked it at number 66 on their "100 Greatest Rap Songs" list. In 2018, Complex ranked the song at number two on their list of the 20 greatest Lauryn Hill songs, and in 2022, American Songwriter ranked the song at number four on their list of the ten greatest Lauryn Hill songs.

Commercial performance
"Everything Is Everything" reached number 35 on the US Billboard Hot 100, spending 18 weeks on the chart. It peaked at number 14 on the Hot R&B/Hip-Hop Songs, spending 24 weeks on the chart. The song also peaked at number 18 on the Rhythmic Top 40, where it charted for 14 weeks. Internationally, it peaked at number 20 on the UK Singles Chart, also reaching the top 20 in New Zealand, where it peaked at number 15. A month after its release as a single, the song was certified gold by the Recording Industry Association of America (RIAA), denoting shipments of 500,000 units in the United States.

Music video
The accompanying music video for "Everything Is Everything" was directed by Sanji. The video depicted Hill on the streets of New York City, which is seen as a huge vinyl record on a turntable spinning around playing the music. She runs down the street in various scenes and stages sidestepping the turntable needle as it scratches back and forth through the city until the end; Hill stands on the spinning record appearing in her name on the label.

The video made its television debut on BET and VH1 during the week ending June 20, 1999. The following week, the video debuted on MTV and The Box. Critically acclaimed, it was nominated for Best Short Form Music Video at the 40th Annual Grammy Awards (2000). The same year, it also received a Soul Train Lady of Soul Award nomination and three MTV Video Music Award nominations–Best Hip-Hop Video, Best Direction, and Best Special Effects.

Track listings and formats

 UK CD1 single
 "Everything Is Everything" (radio edit) – 3:56
 "Ex-Factor" (live on Radio 1) – 6:51
 "Everything Is Everything" (instrumental) – 4:57

 UK CD2 single
 "Everything Is Everything" (album version) – 4:57
 "Lost Ones" (live on Radio 1) – 5:13
 "Tell Him" (live on Radio 1) – 4:40

 US maxi CD single
 "Everything Is Everything" (radio edit) – 3:56
 "Everything Is Everything" (album version) – 4:57
 "Everything Is Everything" (instrumental) – 4:57
 "Ex-Factor" (A Simple Mix) – 4:37
 "Ex-Factor" (A Simple Breakdown) – 4:10

Credits and personnel
Credits adapted from the liner notes of The Miseducation of Lauryn Hill.
 Lauryn Hill – vocals, production, songwriting
 Johari Newton – songwriting
 John Stephens – piano

Charts

Weekly charts

Year-end charts

Certifications

Release history

References

Audio sample to be checked
Lauryn Hill songs
Songs written by Lauryn Hill
1999 singles
Music videos directed by Sanji (director)
Song recordings produced by Lauryn Hill